Jan Roelfs (born 1957 in Amsterdam) is a production designer of Dutch descent. Roelfs was nominated for an Academy Award for Best Art Direction twice for the 1992 film Orlando and for the 1997 film Gattaca. He shared the Orlando nomination with fellow production designer Ben Van Os and the Gattaca nomination with set decorator Nancy Nye. Roelfs also worked as an art director in the 1980s and the 1990s.

Filmography 

Het bittere kruid (1985) – art director
In de schaduw van de overwinning (1986) – production designer
A Zed & Two Noughts (1986) – production designer
Havinck (1987) – art director
Drowning by Numbers (1988) – production designer
Shadowman (1988) – art director
The Cook the Thief His Wife & Her Lover (1989) – production designer
Laura Ley (1989) – art director
Leedvermaak (1989) – art director
Sailors Don't Cry (1990) – art director
Eline Vere (1991) – art director, production designer
Prospero's Books (1991) – production designer
Orlando (1992) – production designer
Dark Blood (1993) – production designer
The Baby of Mâcon (1993) – production designer
1000 Rosen (1994) – art director, production designer

Little Women (1994) – production designer
Gentlemen Don't Eat Poets (1995) – production designer
The Juror (1996) – production designer
Gattaca (1997) – production designer
The Astronaut's Wife (1999) – production designer
Flawless (1999) – production designer
Bad Company (2002) – production designer
S1m0ne (2002) – production designer
Alexander (2004) – production designer
World Trade Center (2006) – production designer
The Hunting Party (2007) – production designer
Lions for Lambs (2007) – production designer
The Lucky Ones (2008) – production designer
My Own Love Song (2010) – production designer
Get Him to the Greek (2010) – production designer
47 Ronin (2013) – production designer
Ghost in the Shell (2017) - production designer

References

External links

1957 births
Living people
Production designers
Designers from Amsterdam
Mass media people from Amsterdam